The Surveillance of Partially Observable Systems is a research method done for the first time by S. Amir Mir M. and Daniel Lane from 2005 to 2008 at the University of Ottawa, Canada.

While Mir was working at the Harvard University, School of Public Health department of Health Policy and Management as a research associate, an opportunity arrived for studying the Axiomatic Design of Complex Systems at the Massachusetts Institute of Technology (MIT) in Boston (2009) USA. This opportunity provided Mir an idea to start a new research based on using the tools and concept of the Axiomatic design on Surveillance of a Complex System, specifically in Surveillance of Partially Observable Systems.

A partially observable system, unlike a system that clearly displays a full state of its components at any given time, attends to display the invisibility of one or more of its external or internal components at any given time. As technology expends, reliability, performance and safety becomes more and more important. Surveillance of system behavior helps to track hazards and performance. Surveillance is a method used as a tool to help understanding or control the impact of new products or technology. Surveillance is the monitoring of responses and adverse effects. System surveillance is the process of monitoring the performance of objects, a population, or process within a system to understand or to achieve a desired standard of performance. The simplest components of surveillance are observation, examination, analysis and supervision.

The conventional method of Surveillance does not apply for a partially visible system. Therefore, a new method is required to observe such complex system at any time given. The Surveillance of a partially observable system offers a mathematical model that uses Markov chains, paired with a Bayesian updating function. The method estimates the statistical impacts of surveillance observations and modified surveillance policies.

Surveillance of Partially Observable Systems on Genetically Modified (GM) Foods 
There are many systems that can be considered as partially observable due to their unknown or partially known structures or the nature of their unknown products and/or partially known results. The impacts of the consumption of genetically modified food (GM) are an example of a system that is only partially observable. The safety of genetically modified foods (GM) products has caused much controversy. Absence of sufficient and reliable information prevents neither certain confidence about the harmlessness of product consumption, nor any certain conclusion to merit a ban for fear of harm. The lack of any reliable or conclusive post-market observation and consumption effects information, make it difficult to establish a global protocol for such products. This paper introduces a model for the analysis of partially observable information from the surveillance of post-market consumption of systems such as genetically modified foods (GM) products. This model uses Markov Chains, paired with a Bayesian updating function to estimate the statistical impacts of surveillance observations and modified surveillance policies. A case study on population health status is used as an illustrative example, which is modeled to demonstrate the impact of policy interventions on simulated data. A cost decision analysis model is also applied to illustrate the impact of policy intervention costs. The model uses a first order Markov chain to estimate the period-over-period change in health status and a Bayesian updating procedure to estimate the population health status based on observations from post-market surveillance. The results show how observation samples can be used to provide information on system changes and improvements.

Axiomatic Design for Complex Systems 
Axiomatic design is an alternative designing method that has a new perspective and different look into methodology of a system design.[3] Designing a complex system, interacting with a large number of components with some nonlinear behaviors. It requires a surgical mechanism with a critical care to investigate the relationships between all sub-systems of each part interacting with a larger component.

This method looks into each sub-system to view a larger picture of the main system. It interacts and forming relationships with its environment. The method applies some principles to a number of case studies and industrial examples ranging from large scale systems to nano-scale systems. It could be also used for the designs of the health-care systems.

Fundamental of design process 
 Understanding the system's requirements, components, and needs
 Identifying the input/output of the system, the "problem" needed to be solved for the absolute satisfaction of the system's needs
 Identifying the functions requirements
 Mapping of the solutions conception, and the synthesis
 A task of identifying a method to satisfy different part of system functional requirements
 Assigning set of inputs for the product design parameters within given constrains
 Optimization of the proposed solution using the perform analysis
 Analyzing the output and checking the final design solution to verify if this solution meets the original system's requirements, components, and needs

References 

Research methods